Dominique Reshard Rodgers-Cromartie (born April 7, 1986) is a former American football cornerback who played 11 years in the National Football League (NFL). He played college football for Tennessee State University, and was drafted by the Arizona Cardinals in the first round of the 2008 NFL Draft. Rodgers-Cromartie has also played for the Philadelphia Eagles, Denver Broncos, New York Giants, Oakland Raiders, and Washington Redskins. He was selected for the Pro Bowl in 2009 and 2015.

Early years
Rodgers-Cromartie is of Haitian descent. He was born with a non-functioning kidney that was removed when he was 8 years old. He attended three high schools, including spending his sophomore year at Lake Highland Preparatory School in Orlando, Florida, before enrolling at Lakewood Ranch High School in Bradenton, Florida, where he first received playing time; and where he was an All-Area, All-Class 5A, and All-District 11 defensive back and wide receiver. He also competed as a jumper and sprinter on the school's track team. He was named the most underrated prospect in Florida by the High School Recruiting Report.

College career
While attending Tennessee State University, he played for the Tennessee State Tigers football team from 2004 to 2007.

In 39 starts for the Tigers, opposing quarterbacks completed just 55 of 161 passes (34.16%) thrown near Rodgers-Cromartie. He intercepted 11 of those throws, deflected 25 and held the opposition to a minuscule 3.54 yards per pass attempt, the best of any collegiate defensive back over his three seasons.

He is a member of Phi Beta Sigma fraternity.

Track and field
Rodgers-Cromartie was also a standout performer for the track team. Juggling football spring drills with the indoor and outdoor track seasons in 2007, he qualified for the NCAA Mid-East Regionals after he captured the Ohio Valley Conference long jump title, with a mark of 7.71 meters. In his second outdoor event, he was named OVC Male Athlete of the Week after finishing third at the Penn Relays with a conference-best long jump of 7.56 meters.

At the OVC Indoor Track Championships, Rodgers-Cromartie was named the top male athlete. He won the 60-meter dash with a time of 6.89 seconds, long jump with a mark of 7.71 meters and high jump with a mark of 2.07 meters and finished second in the triple jump with a mark of 14.83 meters. He performed most of the indoor season while nursing an ankle sprain. He also competed in the 100 meters, posting a career-best time of 10.75 seconds while he was at Lakewood Ranch High School.

Professional career
Rodgers-Cromartie drew relatively little draft interest because his team played generally lackluster teams, and because of weak technique. However, he impressed scouts during Senior Bowl week, performing very well during the arranged practices, and was named defensive MVP for the game. A 4.29 40-yard dash at the NFL combine led to comparisons to Fabian Washington.

Arizona Cardinals
Rodgers-Cromartie was drafted by the Arizona Cardinals in the first round (16th overall) of the 2008 NFL Draft. On July 25, 2008, he signed a five-year, $15.1 million contract with the team that included $9 million guaranteed. He wore number 29. Rodgers-Cromartie was named the starting nickelback for the 2008 season, behind starters Roderick Hood and Eric Green. In Week 11 against the Seattle Seahawks, he  recorded 2 interceptions off Matt Hasselbeck, the second interception securing a Cardinals 26-20 victory. In Week 14 against the St. Louis Rams, Rodgers-Cromartie returned a late fourth quarter interception 99 yards for a touchdown, ensuring a Cardinals victory and subsequent Division Championship title. In the 2008 Wild Card Playoff Game between the Arizona Cardinals and Atlanta Falcons, Rodgers-Cromartie intercepted a pass from Matt Ryan. In the Divisional Round versus the Carolina Panthers, he intercepted a pass from Jake Delhomme in the red zone during the second quarter. Rodgers-Cromartie helped the Cardinals reach the Super Bowl for the first time in franchise history after they defeated the Philadelphia Eagles 32-25 in the NFC Championship game. In Super Bowl XLIII, Rodgers-Cromartie had 5 tackles and 2 passes defended, as the Cardinals lost 27-23 to the Pittsburgh Steelers.

Rodgers-Cromartie recorded 50 tackles and six interceptions in the 2009 NFL regular season. In the wild-card round of the playoffs, he intercepted Green Bay's Aaron Rodgers on the first play of the game to set up a Cardinals touchdown. He was selected as a reserve to the 2010 Pro Bowl. He did not participate in the game due to an injury sustained in the divisional round playoff loss to the New Orleans Saints.

In the 2010 season, he recorded 44 total tackles and three interceptions, two of which were returned for touchdowns. , his three postseason interceptions remained a Cardinals franchise record shared with Aeneas Williams.

Philadelphia Eagles
On July 28, 2011, Rodgers-Cromartie was traded, along with a second round pick, to the Philadelphia Eagles for quarterback Kevin Kolb. He was assigned #23. He registered zero interceptions in his first season with the Eagles, while playing mostly the nickel. His play stepped up considerably in the last four games of the year.

On August 17, 2012, Rodgers-Cromartie was fined $21,000 for hitting Pittsburgh Steelers quarterback Byron Leftwich in the head and neck during the preseason.

In the 2012 season, he recorded 51 total tackles and three interceptions.

Denver Broncos

On March 13, 2013, Rodgers-Cromartie signed a one-year, $5 million contract with the Denver Broncos. He was assigned number 45, which he wore at Tennessee State.

In his second game as a member of the Broncos, Rodgers-Cromartie intercepted Eli Manning in the closing seconds of the first half, in a win against the New York Giants. In week 8, Rodgers-Cromartie intercepted Kirk Cousins, and returned it back 75 yards for a touchdown in a 45-21 win against the Washington Redskins. His third interception came against Matt Schaub and the Houston Texans in week 16, in a 37-13 win.

The Broncos advanced to Super Bowl XLVIII after they defeated the New England Patriots 26-16 in the AFC Championship game. In the Super Bowl, Rodgers-Cromartie had one tackle as the Broncos lost 43-8 to the Seattle Seahawks.

Rodgers-Cromartie finished his only season with the Broncos with 31 tackles and three interceptions.

New York Giants
On March 17, 2014, Rodgers-Cromartie signed a five-year contract with the New York Giants worth $35 million, with $11.98 million guaranteed.

On September 21, 2014, Rodgers-Cromartie recorded three tackles and an interception against the Houston Texans. He recorded his first interception of the season (20th career), picking off Ryan Fitzpatrick and returning it for 10 yards. On December 7, 2014, Rodgers-Cromartie recorded an interception against the Tennessee Titans by picking off Zach Mettenberger and returning it 36 yards for a touchdown. In the 2014 season, Rodgers-Cromartie had 38 total tackles and two interceptions while also having 12 pass deflections.

On June 9, 2015, Rodgers-Cromartie changed to jersey number 41, giving the #21 to Landon Collins. This was his fifth time changing his number in his career.

On October 25, 2015, Rodgers-Cromartie recorded two tackles, two interceptions, and a touchdown against the Dallas Cowboys. He picked off Matt Cassel twice, returning one 58 yards for a touchdown, and the other one for 12 yards. On November 1, 2015, Rodgers-Cromartie recorded six tackles and an interception against the New Orleans Saints. He recorded his 24th career interception, picking off Drew Brees and returning it two yards.  In Rodgers-Cromartie's second season with the Giants he had a career-high 58 tackles. Rodgers-Cromartie also had two forced fumbles, three interceptions and 13 pass deflections. On January 26, 2016, he was named to his second Pro Bowl, replacing the New England Patriots' Malcolm Butler.

On October 23, 2016, Rodgers-Cromartie recorded four tackles and two interceptions against the Los Angeles Rams. He recorded his 25th and 26th career interceptions, picking off Case Keenum twice, catching both in the endzone for touchbacks. He recorded his fifth multi-interception game of his career. On December 18, 2016, Rodgers-Cromartie recorded seven tackles and an interception against the Detroit Lions. He recorded his third interception of the season (27th career), picking off Matthew Stafford in the endzone for a touchback. On December 22, 2016, Rodgers-Cromartie recorded two tackles and an interception against the Philadelphia Eagles. He recorded his fourth interception of the season (28th career), picking off Carson Wentz for no gain. His last interceptions of the season were against Kirk Cousins and the Washington Redskins twice to win the game. He recorded his 30th of his career and 6th of the season.

On October 11, 2017, the Giants temporarily suspended Rodgers-Cromartie after he had an unexcused leave from the team's facility. The suspension triggered when Rodgers-Cromartie argued with head coach Ben McAdoo about being pulled from the previous game in Week 5. Later on,
it was revealed that Cromartie only left facility after McAdoo told him that he was suspended. The next day, on October 12, the Giants officially announced that Rodgers-Cromartie would be suspended indefinitely. He was reinstated from his suspension on October 17.

During the 2018 offseason, the Giants announced that Rodgers-Cromartie would be moved to safety. On March 11, 2018, he was released by the Giants, saving them $6.5 million in cap space.

Oakland Raiders
On August 23, 2018, Rodgers-Cromartie signed with the Oakland Raiders. On October 30, 2018, Rodgers-Cromartie announced his retirement.

Washington Redskins
Rodgers-Cromartie came out of retirement to sign with the Washington Redskins on March 15, 2019. He was placed on injured reserve on September 18, 2019 after suffering a torn ligament in his ankle.

NFL career statistics

Personal life
He is the cousin of cornerbacks Antonio Cromartie, Marcus Cromartie, and Indianapolis Colts cornerback Isaiah Rodgers. His father Stanley was also a former assistant coach for the Bethune–Cookman Wildcats men's basketball team.

References

External links

Dominique Rodgers-Cromartie Foundation
New York Giants bio
Denver Broncos bio
Philadelphia Eagles bio
Arizona Cardinals bio
Tennessee State Tigers bio

1986 births
Living people
American sportspeople of Haitian descent
Sportspeople from Bradenton, Florida
Players of American football from Florida
American football safeties
American football cornerbacks
Tennessee State Tigers football players
Arizona Cardinals players
Philadelphia Eagles players
Denver Broncos players
New York Giants players
Oakland Raiders players
Washington Redskins players
National Conference Pro Bowl players
Unconferenced Pro Bowl players
Lake Highland Preparatory School alumni